Nome may refer to:

Country subdivision 
 Nome (Egypt), an administrative division within ancient Egypt
 Nome (Greece), the administrative division immediately below the peripheries of Greece (pl. )

Places

United States
 Nome, Alaska
 Cape Nome, Alaska
 Nome, North Dakota
 Nome, Texas

Other
 Nome, Norway
 Nome, Queensland, Australia

Other uses 
 Nome (mathematics)
 Gnome, spelled Nome in the Oz books by L. Frank Baum
 Nome King
 Characters in The Nome Trilogy by Terry Pratchett
 Characters in the video game Little Nightmares
 Nome (spiritual teacher) (born 1955)
 NOME, a Guangzhou-based multinational variety store chain founded in 2017

See also
 Nom (disambiguation)
 Nomos (disambiguation)